Sarah Baker is an American actress and comedian, best known for roles in movies such as The Campaign and Mascots, and TV shows like The Kominsky Method and Louie. Baker helped build Whole World Improv Theatre in Atlanta as a performer and teacher.

Life and career 
Baker was born in the Washington, D.C. area and raised in Springfield, Virginia. After graduating from James Madison University with a double major in Theater and English, she moved to Atlanta, Georgia. There, she helped build Whole World Improv Theatre as a performer, and later as a teacher. Moving to Los Angeles, she continued to hone her improvisational and sketch comedy skills at The Groundlings.

In 2012, Baker appeared as Mitzi Huggins, wife of Zach Galifianakis' congressional candidate, along with Will Ferrell, in the comedy The Campaign. The Jay Roach-directed film is the highest grossing politically themed movie of all time. In 2014, she played Becky in Tammy, starring Melissa McCarthy, and directed by Ben Falcone. Baker has also appeared as Pamela Lowi in The Good Lie, about the Lost Boys of Sudan, which was directed by Philippe Falardeau (director of the Oscar-nominated Monsieur Lazhar). In 2015, she appeared in Barry Levinson's Rock the Kasbah, alongside Bill Murray.

In 2016, she was in a number of films, including Christopher Guest's Mascots where she played Mindy Murray, aka Tammy the Turtle. Other movies released in 2016 include The Meddler, starring Susan Sarandon and directed by Lorene Scafaria, where Baker played Elaine. Baker also appeared opposite Shirley MacLaine in The Last Word and in the film adaptation of the acclaimed Speech & Debate, playing Ms. Riggi. In 2018, she appeared as Gildred in Melissa McCarthy's Life of the Party, and co-starred in Paul Feig's A Simple Favor.

On television, Baker was seen as series regular Sonia on the NBC comedy Go On, starring Matthew Perry, as a support group member dealing with the loss of her cat. In 2017, she played the recurring role of Thea Cunningham on HBO's limited series Big Little Lies, based on the popular book of the same name.

She also appeared as Vanessa on the FX show Louie; this performance was nominated for the Critics' Choice Television Award for Best Guest Performer in a Comedy Series. Entertainment Weekly included the performance in its "50 Best TV Scenes" of 2014, and later nominated the performance for one of their annual "EWwy Awards." The performance was included on numerous year-end "best of" lists for 2014, including NPR's "50 Wonderful Things from 2014". This role later led to Baker's performance as Trinity on Pamela Adlon's Better Things in 2016, in an episode written by Adlon and Louis CK.

Other TV appearances have included guest and recurring roles on shows such as A to Z, Bob's Burgers, Bones, Brooklyn Nine-Nine, The Crazy Ones, Ghosted, Graves, Great News, In the Motherhood, Kath & Kim, Key & Peele, Mike & Molly, Modern Family, New Girl, The Office (U.S. version), Santa Clarita Diet, Sean Saves the World, as well as her favorite guest appearance on a TV show, Comedy Bang! Bang! In 2018, Baker appeared in the acclaimed "Kill All Others" episode of Philip K. Dick's Electric Dreams, alongside Mel Rodriguez. Baker appears in the DVD/Blu-ray bonus scenes of the hit comedy Bridesmaids, as a nurse arguing with an injured Paul Rudd. Online, she was seen as Arabella, faithful servant to Megan Mullally in the Funny or Die video Home for Actresses.

Baker is a regular in the Netflix series The Kominsky Method, alongside Michael Douglas and Alan Arkin as Mindy, Douglas' character's daughter. After winning a Golden Globe for Best Comedy Series, the show was renewed for a second season in January 2019. A third and final season of the show was announced in 2020, shortly before it was nominated for an Emmy for Best Comedy Series.

Filmography

Film

Television

Awards and nominations

References

External links 
 
 Sarah Baker Clips on Vimeo

Living people
Actresses from Washington, D.C.
James Madison University alumni
21st-century American actresses
American television actresses
American film actresses
American stage actresses
1974 births